Tettnang is a town in the Bodensee district in southern Baden-Württemberg in Swabia region of Germany.

It lies 7 kilometres from Lake Constance. The region produces significant quantities of Tettnang hop, an ingredient of beer, and ships them to breweries throughout the world.

History
Tettinang or Tettinac was first mentioned in 882 in a document of the Abbey of St. Gall. In the beginning of the 10th century the castle of the Counts of Montfort was built near the town. The town privileges were granted in 1294 by King Adolf of Nassau. The reign of the Counts of Montfort ended 1780 when they sold the county to Austria, along with Tettnang Castle to pay debts. The county became part of Further Austria under the house of Habsburg. In the Peace of Pressburg of 1805 it became Bavarian property which gave it to Württemberg five years later. With the merge of Baden, Hohenzollern and Württemberg in 1952 it became part of the new formed state Baden-Württemberg. Until 1973 it was capital of the district Tettnang which was merged with parts of district of Überlingen to form the Bodenseekreis.

Population development

Trivia
The second release of the Linux operating system Fedora was named "Tettnang" because of the hops grown in Tettnang being used for making beer. The release was preceded by the beer-related name "Yarrow" (an early substitute for hops) and followed by "Heidelberg" (a German city and the name of a distributor of beer).

The anti-virus software vendor Avira, a company with around 100 million customers and 500 employees all over the world, has its headquarters in Tettnang. Based near Lake Constance, the security specialist is one of the biggest regional entrepreneurs.

Gallery

Notable people
 Antje von Dewitz (born 1972), business woman
 Juliane Banse (born 1969), soprano
 Winfried Brugger (1950-2010), legal scientist
 Marco Mathis (born 1994), cyclist
 Sascha Rösler (born 1977), footballer
 Thiemo Storz (born 1991), racing car driver
 Gregor Traber (born 1992), athlete

Other personalities associated with Tettnang

 Eduard Adorno (1920-2000), landowner and politician (CDU)
 Ivan Shekov (born 1942), composer and concert pianist
 Thom Barth (born 1951), painter, graphic artist and installation artist

External links
Official City Homepage
Tettnang Hop Growers, Germany

References

Bodenseekreis
History of Vorarlberg